Veronica Augustyn is an American materials scientist who is a professor and the Jake & Jennifer Hooks Distinguished Scholar in Materials Science & Engineering at North Carolina State University. Her research considers the behavior of materials at electrochemical interfaces for next-generation technologies.

Early life and education 
Augustyn was an undergraduate student in materials science at the University of Arizona. She moved to the University of California, Los Angeles for graduate studies, where she completed a doctorate in materials science. Her research considered nanostructure materials for lithium-ion batteries and electrochemical capacitors. After earning her PhD, Augustyn moved to the Materials Institute at University of Texas at Austin. She spent two years as a postdoctoral fellow.

Research and career 
Augustyn joined North Carolina State University in 2015. Her research considers next-generation energy materials for environmental technologies. These include layered metal oxides, which show potential for electrochemical energy storage materials.

Augustyn joined the Journal of Materials Chemistry A as associate editor in 2021. Together with John Paul Eneku, Augustyn leads SciBridge, a science program that connects scientists in the United States with those working in Africa.

Selected publications

References

Living people
University of Arizona alumni
University of California, Los Angeles alumni
North Carolina State University faculty
American materials scientists
American women scientists
Year of birth missing (living people)